A sled is a type of sliding vehicle.

SLED or sled may also refer to:

People
 Sled Allen (1886–1959), baseballer
 Sled Reynolds, animal trainer

Places
 Sled Lake, Saskatchewan
 Sled Island

Computing
 The SUSE Linux Enterprise Desktop operating system
 Superluminescent diode
 Single Large Expensive Disk, term used contrasting with a Redundant Array of Inexpensive Disks (RAID)

Other uses
 Crosscut sled, a table saw accessory used to hold and slide the workpiece into the saw blade
 State and Local Government and Education
 South Carolina Law Enforcement Division

See also
 Sledd (disambiguation)
 Sleigh (disambiguation)
 Sledge (disambiguation)